Angelo Di Pietro (born 1950 in Avellino, Italy) is an engine designer who developed the Di Pietro Motor air engine.

Life 

He qualified as Congegnatore Meccanico in Avellino and moved to Stuttgart to work on the Wankel rotary engine at the Mercedes Benz research laboratories 1969 and 1970. In 1971 he migrated to Australia where he established a construction engineering company. From his early experience with Wankel rotary engines, Angelo became interested in developing a more efficient engine than the traditional reciprocating internal combustion engine, and he has worked on various alternative concepts intermittently over the last 30 years. In 1999 he made a major design breakthrough with a rotary motor which runs on compressed air.
The engine was called the Angelo Di Pietro's Rotary Positive Displacement Air Engine and Di Pietro claims that his engine is 100% more efficient than competitors' products and that the reduction in friction will allow the engine to turn with a pressure of 1 psi.

Di Pietro targeted locations in which automotive vehicles are required, but cause immense health hazards such as produce markets and warehouses. Di Pietro was determined to find an alternative that was both environmentally conscious, comparable in desired power, and inexpensive.

Angelo Di Pietro's Rotary Positive Displacement Air Engine

The Di Pietro Motor, developed by the Australian company EngineAir, is a rotary engine powered by compressed air. It is smaller than any internal combustion engine although the size may differ between models.

The CA-patent for this engine was published in 2001.
The US-patent for this engine was granted in 2005.

Unlike other rotary engines, the Di Pietro motor uses a simple cylindrical rotary piston (shaft driver) which rolls, with next to no friction, inside the cylindrical stator.
Only 1 psi (≈ 6,8 kPa) of pressure is needed to overcome the friction.

The space between stator and rotor is divided in 6 expansion chambers by pivoting dividers. These dividers follow the motion of the shaft driver as it rolls around the stator wall. 
The cylindrical shaft driver, forced by the air pressure on its outer wall, moves eccentrically, thereby driving the motor shaft by means of two rolling elements mounted on bearings on the shaft. The rolling motion of the shaft driver inside the stator is cushioned by a thin air film. Timing and duration of the air inlet and exhaust is governed by a slotted timer which is mounted on the output shaft and rotates with the same speed as the motor.

Variation of performance parameters of the motor is achieved by varying the time during which the air is allowed to enter the chamber: A longer air inlet period allows more air to flow into the chamber and therefore results in more torque. A shorter inlet period will limit the air supply and allows the air in the chamber to perform expansion work at a much higher efficiency. In this way compressed air (energy) consumption can be exchanged for higher torque and power output depending on the requirements of the application (this is identical to function of the "cutoff" control in a steam engine).

Motor speed and torque are controlled by throttling the amount or pressure of air into the motor. The Di Pietro motor gives instant torque at zero RPM and can be precisely controlled to give soft start and acceleration control.

The Di Pietro Motor can be used in boats, cars, burden carriers and other vehicles. In this application, the engine has all the Environmental Implications, advantages and disadvantages all Compressed-air vehicles share.

See also
 Compressed-air engine

References

External links
 Engine Air Research and Development
 

1950 births
Living people
People from Avellino
21st-century Italian engineers
20th-century Italian engineers